Chemokine receptors are cytokine receptors found on the surface of certain cells that interact with a type of cytokine called a chemokine. There have been 20 distinct chemokine receptors discovered in humans.  Each has a rhodopsin-like 7-transmembrane (7TM) structure and couples to G-protein for signal transduction within a cell, making them members of a large protein family of G protein-coupled receptors. Following interaction with their specific chemokine ligands, chemokine receptors trigger a flux in intracellular calcium (Ca2+) ions (calcium signaling). This causes cell responses, including the onset of a process known as chemotaxis that traffics the cell to a desired location within the organism.  Chemokine receptors are divided into different families, CXC chemokine receptors, CC chemokine receptors, CX3C chemokine receptors and XC chemokine receptors that correspond to the 4 distinct subfamilies of chemokines they bind. Four families of chemokine receptors differ in spacing of cysteine residues near N-terminal of the receptor.

Structural characteristics
Chemokine receptors are G protein-coupled receptors containing 7 transmembrane domains   that are found predominantly on the surface of leukocytes, making it one of the rhodopsin-like receptors. Approximately 19 different chemokine receptors have been characterized to date, which share many common structural features; they are composed of about 350 amino acids that are divided into a short and acidic N-terminal end, seven helical transmembrane domains with three intracellular and three extracellular hydrophilic loops, and an intracellular C-terminus containing serine and threonine residues that act as phosphorylation sites during receptor regulation. The first two extracellular loops of chemokine receptors are linked together by disulfide bonding between two conserved cysteine residues.  The N-terminal end of a chemokine receptor binds to  chemokines and is important for ligand specificity. G-proteins couple to the C-terminal end, which is important for receptor signaling following ligand binding. Although chemokine receptors share high amino acid identity in their primary sequences, they typically bind a limited number of ligands. Chemokine receptors are redundant in their function as more than one chemokine is able to bind to a single receptor.

Signal transduction

Intracellular signaling by chemokine receptors is dependent on neighbouring G-proteins. G-proteins exist as a heterotrimer; they are composed of three distinct subunits.   When the molecule GDP is bound to the G-protein subunit, the G-protein is in an inactive state. Following binding of the chemokine ligand, chemokine receptors associate with G-proteins, allowing the exchange of GDP for another molecule called GTP, and the dissociation of the different G protein subunits. The subunit called Gα activates an enzyme known as Phospholipase C (PLC) that is associated with the cell membrane. PLC cleaves Phosphatidylinositol (4,5)-bisphosphate (PIP2) to form two second messenger molecules called inositol triphosphate (IP3) and diacylglycerol (DAG); DAG activates another enzyme called protein kinase C (PKC), and IP3 triggers the release of calcium from intracellular stores. These events promote many signaling cascades, effecting a cellular response.  

For example, when CXCL8 (IL-8) binds to its specific receptors, CXCR1 or CXCR2, a rise in intracellular calcium activates the enzyme phospholipase D (PLD) that goes on to initiate an intracellular signaling cascade called the MAP kinase pathway.  At the same time, the G-protein subunit Gα directly activates an enzyme called protein tyrosine kinase (PTK), which phosphorylates serine and threonine residues in the tail of the chemokine receptor, causing its desensitisation or inactivation. The initiated MAP kinase pathway activates specific cellular mechanisms involved in chemotaxis, degranulation, release of superoxide anions, and changes in the avidity of cell adhesion molecules called integrins. Chemokines and their receptors play a crucial role in cancer metastasis as they are involved in extravasation, migration, micrometastasis, and angiogenesis. This role of chemokine is strikingly similar to their normal function of localizing leukocytes to an inflammatory site.

Selective pressures on Chemokine receptor 5 (CCR5) 

Human Immunodeficiency virus uses CCR5 receptor to target and infect host T-cells in humans. It weakens the immune system by destroying the CD4+ T-helper cells, making the body more susceptible to other infections. CCR5-Δ32 is an allelic variant of CCR5 gene with a 32 base pair deletion that results in a truncated receptor. People with this allele are resistant to AIDS as HIV cannot bind to the non-functional CCR5 receptor. An unusually high frequency of this allele is found in European Caucasian population, with an observed cline towards the north. Most researchers have attributed the current frequency of this allele to two major epidemics of human history: plague and smallpox. Although this allele originated much earlier, its frequency rose dramatically about 700 years ago. This led scientists to believe that bubonic plague acted as a selective pressure that drove CCR5-Δ32 to high frequency. It was speculated that allele may have provided protection against the Yersinia pestis, which is the causative agent for plague. Many in vivo mouse studies have refuted this claim by showing no protective effects of  CCR5-Δ32 allele in mice infected with Y. pestis. Another theory that has gained more scientific support links the current frequency of the allele to smallpox epidemic. Although plague has killed a greater number people in a given time period, smallpox has collectively taken more lives. As smallpox has been dated back to 2000 years, a longer time period would have given smallpox enough time to exert selective pressure given an earlier origin of CCR5-Δ32. Population genetic models that analyzed geographic and temporal distribution of both plague and smallpox provide a much stronger evidence for smallpox as the driving factor of CCR5-Δ32. Smallpox has a higher mortality rate than plague, and it mostly affects children under the age of ten. From an evolutionary viewpoint, this results in greater loss of reproductive potential from a population which may explain increased selective pressure by smallpox. Smallpox was more prevalent in regions where higher CCR5-Δ32 frequencies are seen. Myxoma and variola major belong to the same family of viruses and myxoma has been shown to use CCR5 receptor to enter its host. Moreover, Yersinia is a bacterium which is biologically distinct from viruses and is unlikely to have similar mechanism of transmission. Recent evidence provides a strong support for smallpox as the selective agent for CCR5-Δ32.

Families
 CXC chemokine receptors (six members)
 CC chemokine receptors (ten/eleven members)
 C chemokine receptors (one member, XCR1)
 CX3C chemokine receptors (one member, CX3CR1)
Fifty chemokines have been discovered so far, and most bind onto CXC and CC families. Two types of chemokines that bind to these receptors are inflammatory chemokines and homeostatic chemokines. Inflammatory chemokines are expressed upon leukocyte activation, whereas homeostatic chemokines show continual expression.

References

External links
 
 The Cytokine Receptor Database

 
Cell biology
Integral membrane proteins